The Man in My Life (French: L' Homme de ma vie, Italian: L'uomo della mia vita) is a 1952 French-Italian drama film directed by Guy Lefranc and starring Madeleine Robinson, Jeanne Moreau and Jane Marken. It was made at the Cinecittà studios in Rome.

Cast
 Madeleine Robinson as Madeleine Dubreuil
 Jeanne Moreau as Suzanne Dubreuil
 Jane Marken as Emma
 Walter Santesso as Michel
 Henri Vilbert as Léon Fontaine
 Gianni Musy as Alberto Grino
 Émile Genevois as Monsieur Grino
 Olga Solbelli
 Umberto Spadaro

External links
 

1952 films
1950s French-language films
Films with screenplays by Michel Audiard
Films directed by Guy Lefranc
French black-and-white films
Italian black-and-white films
French drama films
Italian drama films
1952 drama films
1950s French films
1950s Italian films